Bohregh (also Romanized as Bohrogh; also known as Behrogh-e Takht and Bohregh-e Takht) is a village in Takht Rural District, Takht District, Bandar Abbas County, Hormozgan Province, Iran. At the 2006 census, its population was 124, in 36 families.

References 

Populated places in Bandar Abbas County